This is a list of awards and nominations received by Prithviraj Sukumaran, credited mononymously as, Prithviraj,  an Indian actor, playback singer and producer who predominantly works in Malayalam films. He has also acted in a number of Tamil, Telugu and Hindi films. He has acted more than 100 films.

National Film Awards
 2011 – Best Feature Film in Malayalam (Producer) for Indian Rupee

Kerala State Film Awards
 2012 – Best Actor for Celluloid and Ayalum Njanum Thammil 
 2011 – Best Film (Producer) for Indian Rupee (Shared with Santhosh Sivan & Shaji Nadeshan)
 2006 – Best Actor for Vaasthavam

Tamil Nadu State Film Awards
 2014 – Best Villain for Kaaviya Thalaivan

Kerala Film Critics Association Awards
 2020 – Best Actor for Ayyappanum Koshiyum
 2019 – Special Jury Award (Director) for Lucifer
 2003 – Best Actor for Meerayude Dukhavum Muthuvinte Swapnavum and Chakram

Filmfare Awards
 2014 – Nominated – Best Supporting Actor – Tamil for Kaaviya Thalaivan
 2013 – Winner – Filmfare Critics Award for Best Actor – South for Celluloid
 2016 – Nominated – Best Actor – Malayalam for Pavada
 2015 – Nominated – Best Actor – Malayalam for Ennu Ninte Moideen
 2013 – Nominated – Best Actor – Malayalam for Celluloid
 2012 – Nominated – Best Actor – Malayalam for Ayalum Njanum Thammil
 2011 – Nominated – Best Actor – Malayalam for Indian Rupee
 2010 – Nominated – Best Actor – Malayalam for Anwar
 2010 – Nominated – Best Supporting Actor – Tamil for Raavanan

SIIMA Awards
2020 – Best Actor for Ayyappanum Koshiyum
2019 – Best Debutant Director for Lucifer
2018 – Best Actor (Critics) for Koode
2015 – Best Actor for Ennu Ninte Moideen
2014 – Best Actor (Critics) for 7th Day
2013 – Best Actor ( Critics) for Mumbai Police
2011 – Best Film for Indian Rupee

IIFA Utsavam Awards
 2015 – Best Actor for Ennu Ninte Moideen

Asianet Film Awards
 2019 – Best Director for Lucifer
 2018 – Most Popular Actor for Koode, Ranam
 2015 – Best Actor for Ennu Ninte Moideen 
 2013 – Most Popular Actor for Memories
 2012 – Most Popular Actor for Ayalam Njanum Thammil
 2009 – Youth Icon of the Year
2005 – Special Jury

Zee Cine Awards
 2013 – Nominated – Zee Cine Award for Best Male Debut for Aiyyaa

Asiavision Awards
 2015 – Best Actor for Ennu Ninte Moideen
 2013 – Man of the Year

Vanitha Film Awards
 2020 – Best Director for Lucifer
 2015 – Best Actor for Ennu Ninte Moideen
 2013 – Best Actor for Mumbai Police, Celluloid

Other awards 
 2015 – CPC Cine Awards 2015 – Best Actor for Ennu Ninte Moideen

References

External links
 Awards of Prithviraj Sukumaran in Internet Movie Database.

Sukumaran, Prithviraj